Karl Tore William Thoresson (born 31 May 1932) is a retired Swedish gymnast. He competed at the 1952, 1956, 1960 and 1964 Olympics in all artistic gymnastics event and won two medals in the floor exercise: a gold in 1952 and a silver in 1956. He won another medal on the floor, a bronze, at the 1954 World Championships.

In 2001, Thoresson was inducted into the International Gymnastics Hall of Fame.

References

External links

1932 births
Living people
Swedish male artistic gymnasts
Gymnasts at the 1952 Summer Olympics
Gymnasts at the 1956 Summer Olympics
Gymnasts at the 1960 Summer Olympics
Gymnasts at the 1964 Summer Olympics
Olympic gymnasts of Sweden
Olympic gold medalists for Sweden
Olympic medalists in gymnastics
Medalists at the 1956 Summer Olympics
Medalists at the 1952 Summer Olympics
Medalists at the World Artistic Gymnastics Championships
Olympic silver medalists for Sweden
Sportspeople from Gothenburg